State/Lake is an 'L' station serving the CTA's Brown, Green, Orange, Pink, and Purple Lines. It is an elevated station with two side platforms, located in the Chicago Loop at 200 North State Street. The CTA offers farecard transfers between this station and the Lake subway station on the Red Line.

History

State/Lake station opened on September 22, 1895, as part on the Lake Street Elevated Railroad's extension into the Chicago Loop that later became the north side of the Union Loop. State/Lake is the last station on this section of the Loop to retain many of its original features.

One of a series of videos "shot on iPhone 6" to feature in a 2015 Apple advertising campaign  features the short journey between Randolph/Wabash and State/Lake shot in time lapse.

Bus connections
CTA
  2 Hyde Park Express (Weekday Rush Hours only) 
  6 Jackson Park Express 
  10 Museum of Science and Industry (Memorial Day through Labor Day only)
  29 State 
  36 Broadway 
  62 Archer (Owl Service) 
  146 Inner Lake Shore/Michigan Express

Notes and references

Notes

References

External links

State Street entrance from Google Maps Street View

CTA Brown Line stations
CTA Green Line stations
CTA Orange Line stations
CTA Purple Line stations
CTA Pink Line stations
Historic American Engineering Record in Chicago
Railway stations in the United States opened in 1895
1895 establishments in Illinois